Break Every Rule is the sixth solo studio album by Tina Turner. It was released on September 5, 1986, through Capitol Records in the US. It was the follow-up to Turner's globally successful comeback album, Private Dancer, released two years earlier. Turner nearly scored her second Billboard Hot 100 number one with the lead single "Typical Male", peaking at number two for three consecutive weeks in October 1986, while "Two People" and "What You Get Is What You See" reached the top 30. "Back Where You Started" earned Turner her third consecutive Grammy Award for Best Rock Vocal Performance, Female in 1987.

Composition
The original A-side of the vinyl album was entirely produced by Graham Lyle and Terry Britten, the team behind Turner's 1984 single "What's Love Got to Do with It", while side B included tracks produced by Bryan Adams, Bob Clearmountain, Mark Knopfler and Rupert Hine. Out of the album's eleven tracks, eight were released as singles, either in Europe or the United States or both; "Typical Male" (U.S. No. 2) featuring Phil Collins on drums, "What You Get Is What You See" (U.S. No. 13), "Two People" (Spain No. 1, U.S. R&B No. 18), David Bowie's "Girls" (Poland No. 11), "Back Where You Started" (U.S. Rock No. 18) co-written and produced by Bryan Adams, "Afterglow" (U.S. Dance No. 2) featuring Steve Winwood on keyboards, "Break Every Rule" (Poland No. 15) co-written and produced by Rupert Hine and "Paradise Is Here" (Ireland No. 24).

Most of the 12-inch singles that were released from the album included extended or alternate mixes, live versions and/or non-album tracks, many of which would not see a release on compact disc until the Deluxe Edition box set of Break Every Rule in 2022. Turner also recorded other tracks during the sessions for the album with Steve Lillywhite and Bryan Adams; "Don't Turn Around", produced by Adams, was released as a B-side, but the others remain unreleased.

Following the release of the Break Every Rule album Turner recorded the duet "Tearing Us Apart" with Eric Clapton, included on his Phil Collins-produced 1986 album August and also issued as a single in early 1987.

Commercial performance
The album's predecessor, Private Dancer, set high commercial standards, yet Break Every Rule sold very well worldwide. It reached No. 4 on the Billboard 200, No. 2 on the UK Albums Chart and No. 1 in Switzerland, and also Germany (for 12 weeks). The album sold over 5 million copies worldwide within its first year of release. The RIAA certified Break Every Rule platinum, denoting 1 million shipments in the United States. It was also certified 2× platinum in countries including Germany, Switzerland, Austria, and Canada.

Tour

Turner undertook a huge world tour to promote the album, including a record-breaking date in Rio de Janeiro in which she played to 180,000 people. The concert was filmed and released on home video. Further dates from the European leg of her world tour were recorded and released as the live album Tina Live in Europe in 1988, which won a Grammy Award for Best Female Rock Vocal Performance.

Track listing

B-sides

Personnel 

 Tina Turner – lead vocals, backing vocals (8, 11)
 Nick Glennie-Smith – keyboards (1–6), string arrangements (4)
 Billy Livsey – keyboards (3)
 Steve Winwood – synthesizer solo (5)
 Bryan Adams – acoustic piano (7), guitar (7), backing vocals (7)
 Tommy Mandel – Hammond organ (7)
 Rupert Hine – all instruments (8, 11), arrangements (8, 11), backing vocals (8, 11)
 Guy Fletcher – keyboards (9, 10)
 Albert Boekholt – programming (9, 10)
 Terry Britten – guitars (1–6), bass (1–6), backing vocals (1, 3, 4), programming (2, 4, 5)
 Graham Lyle – mandolin (2)
 Keith Scott – lead guitar (7)
 Jamie West-Oram – guitars (8, 11)
 Mark Knopfler – guitars (9, 10)
 Dave Taylor – bass (7)
 Micky Feat – bass (9)
 Phil Collins – drums (1, 6)
 Jack Bruno – drums (3, 5)
 Mickey Curry – drums (7)
 Jamie Lane – drums (9)
 Garry Katell – percussion (6)
 Jim Vallance – percussion (7)
 Frank Ricotti – percussion (9, 10)
 Tim Cappello – saxophone solo (1)
 Branford Marsalis – soprano saxophone (10)
 Tessa Niles – backing vocals (1, 4, 5)
 Samantha Brown – backing vocals (10)
 Margo Buchanan – backing vocals (10)
 Jimmy Chambers – backing vocals (10)
 George Chandler – backing vocals (10)

Production 
 Terry Britten  – producer (1–6)
 Bryan Adams – producer (7)
 Bob Clearmountain – producer (7), engineer (7), mixing (7)
 Rupert Hine – producer (8, 11)
 Mark Knopfler – producer (9, 10)
 Neil Dorfsman – producer (9, 10), engineer (9, 10)
 Richard Elen – sound designer (1–6)
 John Hudson – engineer (1–6), mixing (1–6)
 Stephen W. Tayler – engineer (8, 11), mixing (8, 11)
 Mike Ging – assistant engineer (1–6)
 Paul Hamilton – assistant engineer (7)
 Mark McKenna – assistant engineer (7)
 Richard Moakes – assistant engineer (7, 9, 10)
 Steve Rinkoff – assistant engineer (7)
 Andrew Scarth – assistant engineer (8, 11)
 Stephen Marcussen – mastering at Precision Lacquer (Hollywood, California).
 Stylorouge – design
 Herb Ritts – photography
 Jenni Bolton – stylist, personal assistant
 Phyllis Cohen – make-up
 Roger Davies – director, management
 Keith Dean – management
 Lindsey Scott – management

Charts

Weekly charts

Year-end charts

Certifications

References

Tina Turner albums
1986 albums
Albums produced by Bob Clearmountain
Albums produced by Mark Knopfler
Albums produced by Rupert Hine
Country albums by American artists